Hyloxalus infraguttatus is a species of frog in the family Dendrobatidae. It is found on the Pacific slopes of Ecuadorian Andes at elevations of  asl.

Description
Males measure  and females  in snout–vent length. Dorsum colouration varies from greenish to pale and dark brown, spotted with dark brown. They have an oblique lateral stripe that extends to the eye. There are white spots on the throat and abdomen.

Habitat and conservation
Its natural habitats are humid premontane forests, tropical thickets and thorny scrubs, and very dry tropical forests. It is a common species but its abundance has been declining. It is threatened by habitat loss from agricultural development, logging, and new wood plantations.

References

infraguttatus
Amphibians of the Andes
Amphibians of Ecuador
Endemic fauna of Ecuador
Amphibians described in 1898
Taxonomy articles created by Polbot